Athlitiki Enosi Larissas  (Athletic Union of Larissa), founded in 1964, is a major Greek multi-sports club based in the city of Larissa, capital of Greece's Thessaly region. The club is also known as AEL, or simply Larissa, and its colors are maroon or crimson and white.

Departments

 Athlitiki Enosi Larissa F.C. - Football 
 A.E.L. 1964 B.C. - Basketball
 Volleyball
 Rugby league
 Athletics

The football team currently competes in Superleague Greece and the basketball team competed in the Greek A2 Basket League.

Sport facilities

The football team plays at the A.E.L. F.C. Arena stadium, AEL's home since 2011 and one of the most modern football grounds in Greece. The club has also its own training facilities in the area of the village Dendra. The facilities cover over 30,000 square meters and have multisport purposes for all of the team's athletes.

A.E.L. 1964 B.C. hosts its home games in the Larissa Neapolis Arena.

Notable supporters 

 Filippos Pliatsikas, musician

References

External links 

 Official site

Sports clubs established in 1964
Multi-sport clubs in Greece
Sport in Larissa